Riikka Ukkola (born 25 March 1968) is a Finnish former swimmer. She competed in two events at the 1992 Summer Olympics.

References

External links
 

1968 births
Living people
Finnish female breaststroke swimmers
Olympic swimmers of Finland
Swimmers at the 1992 Summer Olympics
Swimmers from Helsinki
20th-century Finnish women